Yarlovo is a village in Samokov municipality of Sofia Province in South-West Bulgaria. It is located 24 kilometers away from Sofia.  Located on the West slope of the Vitosha mountain massif, the altitude exceeds 1000 meters. The village has over 500 inhabitants.

Yarlovo Nunatak on Trinity Peninsula in Antarctica is named after the village.

Notes

References
 Yarlovo

Villages in Sofia Province